A twin-screw steamer (or steamship) (TSS) is a steam-powered vessel propelled by two screw propellers, one on either side of the plane of the keel.

Arrangement
All propellers produce a transverse thrust, also called  screwing effect or starting bias, which gives a tendency for end of ship to move sideways. In a twin-screw ships the port propeller is usually left-handed and the starboard right-handed, to cancel out the transverse thrust and avoid propeller walk.

References

Steamboats
Ship types